Daniel Ferrón Pérez (born 13 March 1980) is an Andorran football player. He has played for Andorra national team.

National team statistics

References

1980 births
Living people
Andorran footballers
Association football defenders
Andorra international footballers